"This Room" is a poem by Imtiaz Dharker. It is included in Cluster 2, Poems from Different Cultures, of the AQA Anthology.

References

British poems